"Inside That I Cried" is a song by American singer CeCe Peniston, released as the fifth and last single from her debut album, Finally (1992), on A&M Records. The single release includes "Hitmix", a medley of her songs "Finally", "We Got a Love Thang", "Keep On Walkin'", "Lifeline" and "It Should Have Been You", all taken from the album. "Inside That I Cried" reached the top 10 of the American Billboard Hot R&B Singles & Tracks chart and peaked at number 94 on the US Billboard Hot 100. In the United Kingdom, the song reached number 42 on the UK Singles Chart.

Critical reception
Craig Lytle from AllMusic stated that here, Peniston "tenderly caresses the grieving lyric of the percolating ballad". Larry Flick from Billboard wrote, "After a trio of kinetic club-friendly dance hits, A&M wisely brings forth a mournful, '70s-styled soul ballad that confirms what a growing legion of programmers and consumers already know: Peniston has the voice and charisma to establish a lengthy career as a pop diva." Another editor described the song as a "pensive R&B ballad". John Martinucci from the Gavin Report commented, "Ce Ce slows everything down on her fourth release for urban radio. By eliminating the sometimes distracting high energy production, Ce Ce's beautiful voice gets an opportunity to be showcased on this slow jam."

Track listings and formats

 7-inch, Jamaica, #()
 "Inside That I Cried" (LP Version) - 5:50
 "Inside That I Cried" (Edit) - 4:46

 Cassette, US, #AM 0059/31458 0059
 "Inside That I Cried" (Edit) - 4:46
 "Inside That I Cried" (LP Version) - 5:50

 7-inch, UK, #AM0121/580121-7
 CS, UK, #AMMC 0121/580121-4
 "Inside That I Cried" (Radio Mix) - 3:49
 "Hitmix 7" - 3:56

 12-inch, UK, #AMY 0121/580 121-1
 "Inside That I Cried" (Radio Mix) - 3:49
 "It Should Have Been You" (LP Version) - 5:51
 "Hitmix 12" - 11:29

 MCD, UK, #AMCD 0121
 "Inside That I Cried" (Radio Mix) - 3:49
 "Hitmix 7" - 3:56
 "It Should Have Been You" (LP Version) - 5:51
 "Hitmix 12" - 11:29

Credits and personnel
Management
 Executive producers – Manny Lehman, Mark Mazzetti
 Recording studios – Village Recorders, Los Angeles, California; The House of Soul, Brooklyn, New York; Encore Recording Studios, Burbank, California (mix)
 Publishing – Urban Tracks Music, Mainlot Music, Donyolo Music (BMI)

Production
 Writers – Rodney Jackson, Malik Byrd, Otto D'Agnolo
 Producer, arrangement and musical instruments – Steve Lindsey (moog bass, vibes, Wurlitzer)
 Mixing – Elliot Peters
 Engineering – David Schoeber, Richard Cottrell, Doug de Forest, Robert Paustian (vocals)

Personnel
 Lead vocals – Cecilia Peniston
 Backing vocals – Anthony Warren, Phillis Williams, Jacquelyn Gouche-Farris
 Piano – Robert Buchanan (electric)
 Guitars – Charles Fearing (electric), Dean Parks (acoustic)
 Drums – Edward Greene
 Saxophone – Brandon Fields
 Percussion – Leonard Castro
 Synthesizers – Khris Kellow, John Joseph Barnes (French horn), Buchanan (ARP String Ensemble)

Charts

Release history

"Hitmix"

Credits
Management
 Recording studios – Aztec Studios, Phoenix; Chaton Recordings, Scottsdale, Arizona; Tanglewood Studios, Chicago, Illinois; Axis Studios, Electric Lady Studios (mixing), New York City, New York
 Publishing – Wax Museum Music, Mainlot Music, George You've Got It Music, O'Hara Music, MCA, Island Music (BMI); Last Song, Mushroom Music (AU); IDG (ASCAP)
 Administration – Third Coast Music (ASCAP)

Production
 Writers – Peniston, Felipe Delgado, Elbert Lee Linnear, Eric Miller, Jeremiah McAllister, Chantay Savage , Steven Hurley, Marc Williams, Kimberly Russell , George Lyter, Michael Judson O'Hara, Denise Eisenberg Rich, Darryl Thompson
 Producers – Delgado, Jackson, Hurley , David Morales 
 Mixing – Hurley, Morales, Gail King 
 Arrangement – Hurley, Danny Madden (vocals)
 Remixing – Morales, Hurley
 Engineering – David Sussman, Larry Sturm, John Poppo, Hurley (remix)

Personnel
 Vocals – Peniston
 Backing vocals – Savage, Russell, Donell Rush 
 Percussion – Morales, Bashiri Johnson
 Piano – Eric Kupper (acoustic and solo)
 Keyboards – Hurley, Peter Schwartz , Terrance Burrus, Jackson
 Drums programming – Schwartz, Delgado, Jackson

References

General

 Specific

External links
 

1992 singles
CeCe Peniston songs
1992 songs
A&M Records singles
Songs about heartache
Contemporary R&B ballads
Soul ballads
1990s ballads